The John W. Aughenbaugh House is a historic house in Waseca, Minnesota, United States.  It was built in 1897 and served as the family residence of a prominent local miller.  It was listed on the National Register of Historic Places in 1982 for its local significance in the themes of architecture and industry.  It was nominated for being Waseca's most prominent residence associated with the local milling industry.

See also
 National Register of Historic Places listings in Waseca County, Minnesota

References

1897 establishments in Minnesota
Buildings and structures in Waseca County, Minnesota
Houses completed in 1897
Houses on the National Register of Historic Places in Minnesota
National Register of Historic Places in Waseca County, Minnesota
Renaissance Revival architecture in Minnesota